Frank Egan (1906-1971) was a professional rugby league footballer in Australian leading competition - the New South Wales Rugby League.

Frank Egan played with the Eastern Suburbs club in the 1923 and 1925 seasons and is recognised as that club's 139th player.

References

Australian rugby league players
Sydney Roosters players
1906 births
1971 deaths
Rugby league players from Sydney